K279 or K-279 may refer to:

K-279 (Kansas highway), a state highway in Kansas
Soviet submarine K-279, a former Soviet Union submarine